A mesh network is a local area network topology in which the infrastructure nodes (i.e. bridges, switches, and other infrastructure devices) connect directly, dynamically and non-hierarchically to as many other nodes as possible and cooperate with one another to efficiently route data to and from clients. 

This lack of dependency on one node allows for every node to participate in the relay of information. Mesh networks dynamically self-organize and self-configure, which can reduce installation overhead. The ability to self-configure enables dynamic distribution of workloads, particularly in the event a few nodes should fail. This in turn contributes to fault-tolerance and reduced maintenance costs.

Mesh topology may be contrasted with conventional star/tree local network topologies in which the bridges/switches are directly linked to only a small subset of other bridges/switches, and the links between these infrastructure neighbours are hierarchical. While star-and-tree topologies are very well established, highly standardized and vendor-neutral, vendors of mesh network devices have not yet all agreed on common standards, and interoperability between devices from different vendors is not yet assured.

Basic principles 
Mesh networks can relay messages using either a flooding or a routing technique, which makes them different from non-mesh networks. A routed message is propagated along a path by hopping from node to node until it reaches its destination. To ensure that all its paths are available, the network must allow for continuous connections and must reconfigure itself around broken paths, using self-healing algorithms such as Shortest Path Bridging and TRILL (TRansparent Interconnection of Lots of Links). Self-healing allows a routing-based network to operate when a node breaks down or when a connection becomes unreliable. The network is typically quite reliable, as there is often more than one path between a source and a destination in the network. Although mostly used in wireless situations, this concept can also apply to wired networks and to software interaction.

A mesh network whose nodes are all connected to each other is a fully connected network. Fully connected wired networks are more secure and reliable: problems in a cable affect only the two nodes attached to it. In such networks, however, the number of cables, and therefore the cost, goes up rapidly as the number of nodes increases.

Types

Wired mesh 
Shortest path bridging and TRILL each allow Ethernet switches to be connected in a mesh topology and allow for all paths to be active. IP routing supports multiple paths from source to destination.

Wireless mesh
A wireless mesh network (WMN) is a network made up of radio nodes organized in a mesh topology. It can also be a form of wireless ad hoc network.

See also 
Category of mesh networking technologies
Bluetooth mesh networking
MENTOR routing algorithm
Optical mesh network

References

External links 

 Battelle Institute AoA Comparative Ratings for popular mesh network providers, specific to mission-critical military programs.  
 Architecture and Evaluation of the MIT Roofnet Mesh Network - Draft research paper describing the Roofnet project.
 WING Project Wireless Mesh Network distribution based on the roofnet source code
 First, Second and Third Generation Mesh Architectures History and evolution of Mesh Networking Architectures
 DARPA's ITMANET program and the FLoWS Project Investigating Fundamental Performance Limits of MANETS
 Robin Chase discusses Zipcar and Mesh networking Robin Chase talks at the Ted conference about the future of mesh networking and eco-technology
 irdest Decentralised ad-hoc wireless mesh communication
 Dynamic And Persistent Mesh Networks Hybrid mesh networks for military, homeland security and public safety
 Mesh Networks Research Group Projects and tutorials' compilation related to the Wireless Mesh Networks
 Tetrahedron Core Network Application of a tetrahedral structure to create a resilient partial-mesh 3-dimensional campus backbone data network
 Phantom anonymous, decentralized network, isolated from the Internet
 Qaul Project – Text messaging, file sharing and voice calls independent of Internet and cellular networks
 the free content wiki for project meshnet and supporting projects
 Broadband-Hamnet - Mesh networking application on 2.4GHz spectrum for amateur radio
 AREDN - Amateur Radio Emergency Data network, a mesh networking application used for emergency data and information handling
 Disruption Tolerant Mesh Networks autonomous machine controller in mesh nodes operate despite loss of cloud connectivity.

 
Network topology